Kahnuj (also Romanized as Kahnūj) is a village in Sarbanan Rural District, in the Central District of Zarand County, Kerman Province, Iran. At the 2006 census, its population was 350 in 55 families.

References 

Populated places in Zarand County